Mala'e or Mala'etoli is a village in Wallis and Futuna. It is located in Hihifo District on the southwest coast of Wallis Island. Its population according to the 2018 census was 504 people.

See also
Hihifo Airport

References

Populated places in Wallis and Futuna